Guo Hong (born 31 October 1991) is a Chinese professional racing cyclist. She rode in the women's road race at the 2016 UCI Road World Championships, but she did not finish the race.

References

External links
 

1991 births
Living people
Chinese female cyclists
Place of birth missing (living people)
21st-century Chinese women